Nurmagomedov is a North Caucasian masculine surname originating from the Dagestan area, its feminine counterpart is Nurmagomedova from the Arabic Nurmuhammad (Light of/from Muhammad). It may refer to
Abdulmanap Nurmagomedov (1962–2020), Russian martial arts coach (father of Khabib)
Abubakar Nurmagomedov (born 1989), Russian mixed martial artist (cousin of Khabib)
Gadzhimurad Nurmagomedov (born 1987), Armenian freestyle wrestler of Dagestani descent
Khabib Nurmagomedov (born 1988), Russian mixed martial artist  (son of Abdulmanap, former UFC lightweight champion)
Said Nurmagomedov (born 1992), Russian mixed martial artist
Umar Nurmagomedov (born 1996), Russian mixed martial artist (cousin of Khabib, Elder brother of Bellator lightweight champion Usman)
Usman Nurmagomedov (born 1998), Russian mixed martial artist (cousin of Khabib, Younger brother of Umar)